The Victory Shield 2005 was the 60th edition of the Victory Shield, an annual football tournament competed for by the Under 16 level teams of England, Scotland, Northern Ireland and Wales. It was held from 6 October to 25 November 2006 and was shared by England and Wales.

Venues

Final table

Results

External links
Official Victory Shield website

2005
2005–06 in English football
2005–06 in Scottish football
2005–06 in Welsh football
2005–06 in Northern Ireland association football
October 2005 sports events in the United Kingdom
November 2005 sports events in the United Kingdom